Piet Meiring is a South African theologian and academic. He is a Dutch Reformed Church in South Africa minister and the former director of the Centre for Public Theology at the University of Pretoria. He served on the Truth and Reconciliation Commission.

References

Living people
Members of the Dutch Reformed Church in South Africa
South African theologians
Academic staff of the University of Pretoria
Truth and Reconciliation Commission (South Africa) people
Year of birth missing (living people)